Derbe or Dervi, also called Derveia, was a city of Galatia in Asia Minor, and later of Lycaonia, and still later of Isauria and Cappadocia. Derbe is notable because it is the only city mentioned in the New Testament where the message of the Gospel was accepted from the beginning by its inhabitants.

Etymology
Derbe is derived from Derbent which is derived from Persian "Darband" (from dar “gate” + band “bar,” lit. “barred gate”), referring to an adjacent pass, to a narrow gate entrance.

Location 
There may have been several cities with the name Derbe, since Derbe (meaning narrow gate or entrance) is mostly a geographical toponym (e.g. Derbent).

Strabo places Derbe “on the sides” of Isauria, and almost in Cappadocia. Elsewhere, he says it was in the eleventh praefecture of Cappadocia. When the apostles Paul and Barnabas visited Derbe, it was in Lycaonia. Stephanus of Byzantium places Derbe in Isauria.

Although subject to controversy, this is considered the most likely site.

Stephanus of Byzantium says that Derbe would have had a port (λιμήν , limēn), but this is an obvious mistake, as the city was located inland. This has been corrected to the form limnē (λίμνη , 'lake'], as there are some lakes in the vicinity, albeit a little further away. In modern Turkey there is a village named Derbent, nearby a lake and nearby Iconium city. There is also a district that is named Derbent.

History

Antipater of Derbe, a friend of Cicero, was ruler of Derbe, but was killed by Amyntas of Galatia, who added Derbe to his possessions.

Claudioderbe was a special title given to Derbe during the reign of the Roman Emperor Claudius; it appears on second century coins from Derbe.

The Bishopric of Derbe became a suffragan see of Iconium. It is not mentioned by later Notitiae Episcopatuum. Just four bishops are known, from 381 to 672.

Derbe is included in the Catholic Church's list of titular sees.

− 	
Saint Timothy was a native of Derbe (or of Lystra). Derve may also be linked to Dervish or Derviş (literally means mendicant, 'beggar', 'one who goes from door to door'), a  mystic Sufi fraternity from Iconium whose most common practice Sama is directly associated with the 13th-century Persian mystic Rumi. The firstborn son of Rumi named Veled escaped death miraculously nearby Derbe (other sources report that it was the second son of Rumi that escaped death miraculously). The place where the miracle happened is mentioned as "Paul's cave" in Meyers Reisebücher. Maybe the dance named devr-i veledi that precedes the Sema ceremony is also related to Derve. According some rumors, Devr-i veledi (that was played during circumcision ceremonies) also refers to the circumcision of Rumi's father Bahā ud-Dīn Walad during the pilgrimage, and this action is somehow accossiated to the circumcision of Saint Timothy .

References

Roman towns and cities in Turkey
New Testament cities
Former populated places in Turkey
Geography of Karaman Province
Catholic titular sees in Asia
Populated places in ancient Lycaonia
Populated places in ancient Galatia
Populated places in ancient Isauria
Populated places in ancient Cappadocia
Populated places of the Byzantine Empire
History of Karaman Province